Scaphiophryne spinosa is a species of frog in the family Microhylidae. It is endemic to eastern Madagascar. It has been considered synonym of Scaphiophryne marmorata, but a revision in 2002 restored its species status.
It inhabits pristine rainforests, swampy forests, forest edges, and degraded forests; it is absent from very open areas. Habitat loss is a threat to this species.

References

Scaphiophryne
Endemic frogs of Madagascar
Taxonomy articles created by Polbot
Amphibians described in 1882